Matchstick Productions, also known as MSP Films, is a film production company based in Crested Butte, Colorado that specializes in content creation and expert cinematography. Steve Winter and Murray Wais founded the company in 1992. According to MSP’s website, “Matchstick aims to create entertaining films that not only are stunning visually but on the cutting edge of action sports.”

MSP has released a feature-length ski movie every year since 1992 with several gaining critical acclaim: their breakthrough film “Ski Movie”, featuring many of the world’s best skiers at the time, was released in 2000 and won “Movie of the Year” from both Powder Magazine and Freeze Magazine. MSP is the most award-winning ski film company in history, with eight “Movie of the Year” honors and “Best Documentary” prize at the Powder Video Awards, three Emmy nominations for outstanding camerawork, and “Viewers’ Choice” runner-up at the 2013 Tribeca Film Festival.

Filmography
 Soul Sessions - 1993
 The Hedonist - 1994
 The Tribe - 1995
 The Fetish - 1996
 Pura Vida - 1997
 Sick Sense - 1998
 Global Storming - 1999
 Ski Movie - 2000
 Ski Movie 2 : High Society - 2001
 Ski Movie III: The Front Line - 2002
 Immersion - 2002
 Seth Morrison Chronicles - 2003
 Focused - 2003
 Yearbook - 2004
The Hit List- 2005
 Push/Pull - 2006
 Seven Sunny Days: Short Stories From A Long Winter - 2007
 Claim - 2008
 In Deep - 2009
 The Way I See It - 2010
 Attack of La Nina - 2011 
 Superheroes of Stoke - 2012
 McConkey - 2013
 Days of My Youth - 2014
 Fade to Winter - 2015
 Ruin and Rose - 2016
 Drop Everything - 2017
 All In - 2018
 Hoji - 2018
Return to Send'er - 2019
HUCK YEAH! - 2020
A Biker's Ballad - 2021

McConkey 
Shane McConkey began working with Matchstick in 1995 while filming their movie “The Tribe”. Shane became close with the MSP crew, and starred in almost all of the MSP films from 1998 through 2008.

On March 26, 2009, while filming with MSP in the Dolomite Mountains of Italy, Shane was attempting a ski-BASE jump when one of his skis did not release causing a catastrophic failure and ultimately his death. In 2013, MSP and Red Bull Media House released McConkey a documentary film about Shane's life and untimely death. The world premiere was held in Shane's hometown of Squaw Valley, California before a crowd of 4,500 viewers.

Cineflex Elite 
In 2013 MSP purchased a Cineflex Elite gyro-stabilized camera system built by General Dynamics. Primarily used for aerial film work from a helicopter, MSP has developed unique mounts to attach the Cineflex system to a pickup truck (CineTruck) and side-by-side ATV (CineRanger). This camera system has since been utilized to film aerial shots for the motion picture “KickAss 2”, the 2014 Baja 500 off-road race, and commercial projects for Anheuser-Busch and American Express in addition to MSP’s 2014 ski film “Days of My Youth.”.

References

External links 
 Article on HookedOnWinter.com - WikiWinter

Companies based in Colorado
Skiing organizations
Film production companies of the United States